The 1920 Villanova Wildcats football team represented the Villanova University during the 1920 college football season. The Wildcats team captain was Elmer Hertzler.

Schedule

References

Villanova
Villanova Wildcats football seasons
Villanova Wildcats football